Rob Dehlinger is a singer, trumpet player, and composer living in the San Francisco Bay Area.    He is the frontman for “Robert Dehlinger’s Alpha Rhythm Kings”.

As a live trumpeter and backup vocalist Rob has worked with many performers including Ledisi, Wanda Jackson, Dan Aykroyd, Meat Loaf, Michael Bolton, and Lena Prima.  Rob was a member of the band Stompy Jones from 2006 to 2017.

Rob is "an exhilarating, charismatic trumpet player" and a "magnetic" singer, according to Jazz Corner (March 28, 2018).

Dehlinger's music, jingles, and other audio productions are featured heavily in the world of podcasts, especially in those which focus on topics related to Disney properties (Star Wars in particular). He is referred to as the "John Williams of Podcasting" by hosts and fans of shows such as 
"Skywalking Through Neverland", "The Neverland Podcast", "Talking Apes TV", "Rebel Force Radio", "Disney Vault Talk", "Fangirls Going Rogue", "Almost Famous", and others.

Rob composed the musical score for the film “Portable Storage”, which enjoyed a screening at Lucasfilm/ILM in San Francisco, and was released in 2016.

Rob has appeared on the nationally televised PBS specials "A Taste of Chanukah" and "A Taste of Passover", as well as an Emmy-award-winning episode of the Bay Area PBS arts show "Spark". Rob works routinely in the Bay Area venues, including Slim's, Great American Music Hall, Yoshi's, Bimbo's, Yerba Buena Center for the Arts, Bill Graham Civic Auditorium, the Regency Ballroom, and George Lucas' Skywalker Sound studios. He performs regularly at Disneyland in Anaheim, California, and has toured Europe and Australia.

Dehlinger's orchestral arrangement of Iggy Pop's "Lust For Life" was recorded by San Francisco's Punk Rock Orchestra with Grammy winning engineer Leslie Ann Jones, and was featured on NPR's Weekend Edition.

Rob's band, the Alpha Rhythm Kings, performed for the 2018 Grammy Awards Nominee Celebration, San Francisco Chapter. He holds bachelor's and master's degrees from the New England Conservatory in Boston, MA.

Dehlinger is also a prominent music educator in the San Francisco Bay Area.

Discography

With “Robert Dehlinger’s Alpha Rhythm Kings”

 Choo Choo Ch’Boogie (Feat. Tammi Savoy), single, Dehlinger Productions (2021)
 Sharp Dressed Men, Dehlinger Productions (2020)
 California Boogie, E.P., Dehlinger Productions (2017)

As a Solo Artist
 Life as a Joy Ride, single, Dehlinger Productions (2012)
 Raul, single, Dehlinger Productions (2012)
 Psychological Archeology, single, Dehlinger Productions (2013)
 Songs For My Friends, Volume 1, Dehlinger Productions (2014)
 Skywalking Through Neverland: Awesome Jingle Mix, Vol. 1, Dehlinger Productions (2016)

As a Band Member
 A Taste of Passover, Rounder Records.  Trumpet (1998)
 A Taste of Chanukah, Rounder Records.  Trumpet (1999)
 Avocado Igloo, The Circadians, Papa Cosmo Music.  Vocals, Trumpet, Keyboard, Co-Songwriter (2001)
 That's Alright, Stompy Jones, Harp Records.  Trumpet, Backing Vocals (2007)
 Santa Claus, single, Whack Magic, Dehlinger Productions.  Vocals, Trumpet, Co-Songwriter (2008)
 Built to Last, single, Whack Magic, Dehlinger Productions.  Vocals, Trumpet, Co-Songwriter (2012)
 Sock it to Me, Stompy Jones, Harp Records.  Trumpet, Backing Vocals. (2012)

As a Side Man
 Long Way From Tomorrow, Small Change Romeos, Milk Jug Music. (2004)
 Life After 339, Panthelion, Dvorzak Publishing.  Trumpet, track 1 "Blue at Midnight" & track 4 "Ink" (2006)
 All Night Party, Phil Berkowitz, Dirty Cat Records.  Trumpet, track 5 "Always a First Time" & track 14 "The Party's Over" (2009)
 Kit and the Branded Men.  Trumpet, track 10 "I Don't Wanna Drink Every Night" (2011)
 Strugglin''', single 45rpm, The Lugknuckles, Lugnut Brand Records (2011)
 Find Shelter Here, Beckah Barnett, Cry Love Records.  Trumpet, track 3 "Saint Valentine" & track 8 "To Whom it May Concern" (2012) 
 Listening to the Light, Verlin Chalmers, Wax Light Music.  Trumpet (2012)
 Rise & Shine, Scott Gagner.  Trumpet & Flugelhorn (2014)
 Greater Things'', The Harmalators.  Trumpet, track 1 "Greater Things" & track 4 "I Want You to Know"  (2015)

References

 Contra Costa Today
https://contracostatoday.com/2018/02/08/music-around-the-bay-ep-005-rob-dehlinger/
 Jazz Corner Review
http://www.jazzcorner.com/news/display.php?news=8560
 No Depression Article 
http://nodepression.com/interview/frontmantrumpeter-robert-dehlinger-debuts-alpha-rhythm-kings-swinging-energy
 
 Rob Dehlinger IMDB https://www.imdb.com/name/nm4821063/
 Stompy Jones Band http://www.stompyjones.com
 The Penguin Newsletter http://www.necpenguin.com/rob-dehlinger/
 NPR Interview https://www.youtube.com/watch?v=XXEFG-V5qJE
 Pittsburg Entertainment & Arts Hall of Fame http://www.pittsburgentertainmentandarts.org/Bios.htm
 http://lmcexperience.com/features/2014/10/09/music-is-in-the-air-this-fall/
 http://lmcexperience.com/features/2014/10/16/bands-awe-a-full-house/
 http://issuu.com/lmc_experience/docs/october_17__2014_vol._81_no._7
 http://www.taxi.com/transmitter/0512/deals0512C.html
 https://www.npr.org/2004/04/24/1850470/punk-orchestra
 http://www.kqed.org/arts/programs/spark/profile.jsp?essid=20100
 http://www.allmusic.com/artist/robert-dehlinger-mn0001922224/credits 
 http://clambakejazz.com/our-bands/
 http://www.thefreight.org/phil-berkowitz-louis-blues
 http://atownagency.com/june28.htm
 https://www.lajazz.com/popup.cfm?task=description&module=1&template=19&title=%20&imagefile=%20&imagewidth=0&imageheight=0&imagealt=%20&ID=350092

American trumpeters
American male trumpeters
Singer-songwriters from California
American male singer-songwriters
Musicians from the San Francisco Bay Area
New England Conservatory alumni
Living people
21st-century trumpeters
21st-century American male musicians
Year of birth missing (living people)